Psychonoctua masoni is a moth in the family Cossidae. It was described by Schaus in 1892. It is found in Mexico and southern Texas.

References

Natural History Museum Lepidoptera generic names catalog

Zeuzerinae
Moths described in 1892